Ülle Rajasalu (born 6 May 1953) is an Estonian politician. From 1999 to 2004 she was an Elder of the Pirita District, Tallinn. She became the governor of Harju County in 2009.

Sources
  (Estonian)

1953 births
Living people
Estonian Reform Party politicians
Members of the Riigikogu, 2003–2007
Members of the Riigikogu, 2007–2011
Members of the Riigikogu, 2011–2015
Women members of the Riigikogu
University of Tartu alumni
20th-century Estonian politicians
21st-century Estonian politicians
21st-century Estonian women politicians